Desiring-production is a term coined by the French thinkers Gilles Deleuze and Félix Guattari in their book Anti-Oedipus (1972).

Overview
Deleuze and Guattari oppose the Freudian conception of the unconscious as a representational "theater", instead favoring a productive "factory" model: desire is not an imaginary force based on lack, but a real, productive force. They describe the machinic nature of desire as a kind of "desiring-machine" that functions as a circuit breaker in a larger "circuit" of various other machines to which it is connected. Meanwhile, the desiring-machine is also producing a flow of desire from itself. Deleuze and Guattari conceptualize a multi-functional universe composed of such machines all connected to each other: "There are no desiring-machines that exist outside the social machines that they form on a large scale; and no social machines without the desiring machines that inhabit them on a small scale." Desiring-production is explosive: "there is no desiring-machine capable of being assembled without demolishing entire social sectors".

The concept of desiring-production is part of Deleuze and Guattari's more general appropriation of Friedrich Nietzsche's formulation of the will to power.  In both concepts, a pleasurable force of appropriation of what is outside oneself, incorporating into oneself what is other than oneself,  characterizes the essential process of all life.  Similarly, a kind of reverse force of "forgetting" in Nietzsche and the body without organs in Deleuze and Guattari disavows the will to power and desiring-production, attempting to realize the ideal of a hermetic subject.

Thenceforth, while very interested by Wilhelm Reich's fundamental question—why did the masses desire fascism?—they criticized his dualist theory leading to a rational social reality on one side, and an irrational desire reality on the other side. Anti-Œdipus was thus an attempt to think beyond Freudo-Marxism; and Deleuze and Guattari tried to do for Freud what Marx had done for Adam Smith.

In his early writings (Machine et Structure), Guattari discussed a machinic-phylum, and talked of the machinic and evasive character of desire; composed of concepts similar to Deleuzian ones (in particular, to series and repetitions), and other structures which show congruence with the ideas developed later, with his collaborator, Gilles Deleuze (see assemblage theory). The subject for these early writings was situated at the border of determined machines at one end, and a field of undetermined structures on the other side, composed of becomings, and technological advancement and re-emergences. Desiring Machines have nothing to do with the Oedipus, and nothing to do with the discourses or methods of the psychoanalytic neurotic. Desiring production is a primary and transcendental (in the immanent or Kantian sense) and virtual process of the perpetual emergence of corporeal, and incorporeal relations, which develop and emerge from real genetic, organic, and anorganic histories, social machines, and contingent worlds or "modes" of desiring production. Desiring machines are breaks, or sudden stops, in a pool or field of flows. However, the desiring-machines are also flows in themselves, which operate at different speeds in comparison to their environment (see dissipative system), and can be considered static in the plane of composition (i.e., in relation to the extraneous flows which it cuts through with the mechanisms of the passive syntheses). However, in the plane of consistency, all the desiring machines are flowing, and all the flows are consistent (and active) and are found as continuous gradients of velocities (or forces) and capacities (or intensities), both relating to Nietzschean metaphysics, and to the physical interlude in Ethics. The desiring-machines have no object, nor subject, and they produce in flows which are beyond systematicity, and thus, reject the double-articulated, representational semiosis of subjectivity, as present in Lacan, and as dormant in Freud, Hegel, and Kant. "The power of the machine, is that one cannot ultimately distinguish the unconscious subject of desire from the order of the machine itself."

Desiring-machines participate in events of convergence, where partial objects and BwOs are conjoined upon an amorphous lattice of codes (milieus and strata), and an apparent counter-flow of decoding (deterritorialisation and territories), producing lineages and multiplicities of gears, events, and productive elements, regardless of whether such parts are concordant or discordant; positive or negative. Instead, production is an unyielding and affirmative process of connection (as opposed to teleology, dialectics, essentialism, and hylomorphism, etc.,) and then the resultant divisions and quotients which emerge in relation to BwOs.

Deleuze and Guattari also discuss other more resistant machines, such as Bachelor machines, Miraculating machines, Celibate machines, and Paranoiac machines, which all have specific relations to a socius (the Paranoiac and the Miraculating machine), or to a collective apparatus of strata (the Bachelor and Celibate machines, as exemplified in Kafka).

Hardt has suggested that Desiring-production is a social or cosmological ontology. Foucault, however, has suggested against using such a model for general and systematic claims.

Published in the same year as Anti-Œdipus, Guy Hocquenghem's Homosexual Desire re-articulated desiring-production within the emergent field of queer theory.

See also 
Erewhon
Plane of immanence

Sources

 Deleuze, Gilles and Félix Guattari. 1972. Anti-Œdipus. Trans. Robert Hurley, Mark Seem and Helen R. Lane. London and New York: Continuum, 2004. Vol. 1 of Capitalism and Schizophrenia. 2 vols. 1972-1980. Trans. of L'Anti-Oedipe. Paris: Les Editions de Minuit. .
 ---. 1980. A Thousand Plateaus. Trans. Brian Massumi. London and New York: Continuum, 2004. Vol. 2 of Capitalism and Schizophrenia. 2 vols. 1972-1980. Trans. of Mille Plateaux. Paris: Les Editions de Minuit. .
 Guattari, Félix. 1984. Molecular Revolution: Psychiatry and Politics. Trans. Rosemary Sheed. Harmondsworth: Penguin. . 
 ---. 1995. Chaosophy. Ed. Sylvère Lotringer. Semiotext(e) Foreign Agents Ser. New York: Semiotext(e). .
 ---. 1996. Soft Subversions. Ed. Sylvère Lotringer. Trans. David L. Sweet and Chet Wiener. Semiotext(e) Foreign Agents Ser. New York: Semiotext(e). .
 Hocquenghem, Guy. 1972. Homosexual Desire. Trans. Daniella Dangoor. 2nd ed. Series Q Ser. Durham: Duke UP, 1993. .
 Massumi, Brian. 1992. A User's Guide to Capitalism and Schizophrenia: Deviations from Deleuze and Guattari. Swerve editions. Cambridge, USA and London: MIT. .
 Holland, Eugene W. 1999. Deleuze and Guattari's Anti-Oedipus: Introduction to Schizoanalysis. New York: Routledge. .

References

Concepts in the philosophy of mind
Félix Guattari
Gilles Deleuze